Major Deshamanya Duncan M. White MBE, ED (1 March 1918 – 3 July 1998) was a Sri Lankan sportsman. He was the first Ceylonese athlete to win an Olympic medal, winning silver in the 400-metre hurdles at the 1948 Summer Olympics in London, England. He was also the second South Asian to have won an Olympic medal in track and field after Norman Pritchard of India, with the third being Susanthika Jayasinghe, another Sri Lankan, won a silver medal in the 200 metres in 2000.

Early life
White was born on 1 March 1918 in Lathpandura, near Kalutara, in British Ceylon, the second of four children of John Bernard White and Cecilia Hawk White. He had three brothers, Frederick A. White, also an athlete, Stanley Leonard White and Douglas Andrew White (died 1960). He was educated at Trinity College, Kandy where he was awarded 'Trinity Lion' for athletics; however, this was subsequently withdrawn for disciplinary reasons. He left Trinity in 1937.

Sporting career
He was selected to the college athletics team at the age of 16 in 1934. He became the college athletics captain at the age of 18 in 1936. He took part in 400-yard hurdles at the 1938 British Empire Games but could not deliver the expected performances after suffering a hamstring injury. He was incredibly the only schoolboy to have picked in the Sri Lankan contingent for the 1938 British Empire Games. He became champion at national public schools championships, Ceylon championships and India-Ceylon championships. He was chosen to represent Ceylon at the dual meet against India in 1945 (Indo-Ceylon Dual Athletic Meet) where he competed in the men's 4×100 yards relay event alongside Summa Navaratnam, R. E. Kitto and Basil Henricus.

In 1948, he was selected for the team that represented Ceylon at that year's Summer Olympics in London; the country had gained its independence from Britain that year. It was also historically Sri Lanka's first ever appearance at the Olympics. White was also chosen as the flag-bearer for Sri Lanka during the opening ceremony of the 1948 Summer Olympics.
During the 1948 Summer Olympics trials, he surprisingly withdrew from competing in men's 100m and 400m events, a decision which did not go too well with the sports officials and the authorities at the times.

He won silver in the 400-meter hurdles in the final on 31 July 1948, the first Olympic medal for Ceylon. He had trained for only about 3 months before the games while the gold medallist, Roy Cochran of the United States, had trained for about 4 years. Most importantly, White secured Sri Lanka's first ever Olympic medal in the county's debut appearance at the Games. His silver medal achievement came only two days after the opening ceremony of the Olympics. White's time, 51.8 seconds, was only 0.7 seconds behind Cochran; both times bettered the existing Olympic record.

He competed in men's 200m event but was did not progress beyond first round.

After the Olympic victory, White was welcomed at a ceremony at Trinity College and was honoured with the return of his 'Lion'. In his speech at the special assembly, White said: "[A]lthough my victory at the Olympics is prestigious, the 'Lion' makes me feel more honoured than that", and received the 'Lion' with open arms. The Government of Ceylon awarded him a scholarship to Loughborough University, where he won the Inter-University Challenge Shield. He was appointed a Member of the Order of the British Empire (MBE) and awarded the Helms World Trophy as the "Most Outstanding Athlete" in Asia. 

In the 1950 British Empire Games in Auckland, New Zealand, White won the 440-yard hurdles, only 0.3 seconds behind the world record. He also became the first Sri Lankan to win a gold medal in any sporting event after the independence. He also teamed up with fellow prominent track and field athletes Summa Navaratnam, John de Saram and Oscar Wijesinghe in the men's 4 × 110 yards event where Sri Lanka finished at fourth position during the 1950 British Empire Games. He also missed  out on another bronze medal chance after placing fourth position in the men's 4 × 400 yards event.

Military career
In 1942, during World War II, White was commissioned as an officer in the Ceylon Light Infantry. He was demobilised in 1947. He later joined the Ceylon Volunteer Force, going on to become a Major and gaining the Efficiency Decoration.

Academic career
After graduating from Loughborough, he returned to Ceylon in 1951 and was appointed the physical education lecturer at the teachers' college in Maharagama. In 1958, the Department of Education appointed him coach of the Sri Lanka Schools Athletic Association. In 1963 he took up a post as lecturer at the University of Nigeria in 1963 and went on to become a senior lecturer at the University of Ibadan. He eventually settled in Nuneaton, Warwickshire, England, briefly returning to Nigeria as an advisor on sports activities.

The Duncan White Sports Foundation was founded on his 72nd birthday, 1 March 1990, and White presented the first award to Sriyantha Dissanayake on 1 March 1991.

Personal life and death
White married Angela Siebel in 1952 and had six children: Maxine, Nita, Christopher, Dan, Marilyn and Fiona. His brother Freddie White was a Sri Lankan legendary field hockey player. He died in 1998 in Nuneaton, despite having said that he intended to migrate with his family to Australia. His wife remained in Nuneaton.

Honours 
He was conferred with the prestigious Deshamanya award in 1998 by the then Sri Lankan President Chandrika Kumaratunga exactly on the 50th anniversary of his silver medal achievement which was accomplished on 31 July 1948.
Member of the Order of the British Empire (MBE) in 1949 
Helms World Trophy
Awarded the title Deshamanya by the Government of Sri Lanka in 1998
Depicted on a Sri Lankan postage stamp in 1988

See also
Nagalingam Ethirveerasingam
Summa Navaratnam
Sriyantha Dissanayake
Susanthika Jayasinghe

References

External links 

 
 

1918 births
1998 deaths
Alumni of Trinity College, Kandy
Burgher military personnel
Burgher sportspeople
Athletes (track and field) at the 1948 Summer Olympics
Athletes (track and field) at the 1938 British Empire Games
Athletes (track and field) at the 1950 British Empire Games
Commonwealth Games gold medallists for Sri Lanka
Commonwealth Games medallists in athletics
Members of the Order of the British Empire
Olympic athletes of Sri Lanka
Olympic silver medalists for Sri Lanka
People from Western Province, Sri Lanka
People from British Ceylon
Ceylon Light Infantry officers
Sri Lanka Army Volunteer Force officers
Sri Lankan male hurdlers
Medalists at the 1948 Summer Olympics
Olympic silver medalists in athletics (track and field)
Deshamanya
Medallists at the 1950 British Empire Games